Angelo Delvonne Crowell (born August 16, 1981) is a former American football linebacker. He was drafted by the Buffalo Bills in the third round of the 2003 NFL Draft. He played college football at Virginia.

He is the younger brother of former NFL wide receiver Germane Crowell.

College career
Crowell attended the University of Virginia, where he served as co-captain in 2002. Received 1st Team All-ACC honors in 2002. Set a school record for tackles of 144 in 2001, and then broke his own record the following year.

Professional career

Buffalo Bills
He served primarily as a reserve linebacker for his first two seasons, playing only on special teams.  In 2005, after Takeo Spikes went down with a season ending tear of the Achilles tendon Crowell took a spot on the starting roster.  He went on that season to record 119 tackles, 1 forced fumble, and 2 interceptions in 12 starts.

In the summer of 2006, he was named the starting strong side linebacker by Buffalo head coach Dick Jauron, replacing Jeff Posey. Crowell started every game until suffering a late season injury against the San Diego Chargers.

Crowell underwent arm surgery after tearing his triceps muscle in the final game of the 2007 season.

On September 4, 2008, Crowell was placed on season-ending injured reserve after undergoing knee surgery.

Tampa Bay Buccaneers
An unrestricted free agent after the 2008 season, Crowell signed with the Tampa Bay Buccaneers on March 18, 2009. He was placed on season-ending injured reserve on August 24 after suffering a torn biceps muscle during the preseason. On June 18, 2010, Crowell was released by the Tampa Bay Buccaneers.

Omaha Nighthawks
Crowell was signed by the Omaha Nighthawks of the United Football League on August 23, 2011.

NFL statistics

Key
 GP: games played
 COMB: combined tackles
 TOTAL: total tackles
 AST: assisted tackles
 SACK: sacks
 FF: forced fumbles
 FR: fumble recoveries
 FR YDS: fumble return yards 
 INT: interceptions
 IR YDS: interception return yards
 AVG IR: average interception return
 LNG: longest interception return
 TD: interceptions returned for touchdown
 PD: passes defensed

References

External links
Buffalo Bills bio
Tampa Bay Buccaneers bio
Just Sports Stats

1981 births
Living people
Players of American football from Winston-Salem, North Carolina
American football linebackers
Virginia Cavaliers football players
Buffalo Bills players
Tampa Bay Buccaneers players
Omaha Nighthawks players